KEMR (1080 AM) is a radio station licensed to serve Moriarty, New Mexico, United States. It is owned by the Isleta Radio Company. KEMR airs a format featuring classic hits on weekdays and oldies on weekends along with community information and local weather reports. KEMR is also broadcast on FM translator K271DC 102.1 MHz at 99 watts atop Sandia Crest with an eastward directional antenna. 

The station was assigned the KQNM call sign by the Federal Communications Commission on May 18, 2009. On September 22, 2015, the KQNM call letters were moved to 1550 in Albuquerque with 1090 picking up the KRKE callsign previously held by that station. On November 1, 2017, the KRKE call letters were transferred to 101.3 in Albuquerque with 1090 picking up the KSFE call sign.

According to the FCC database, the station has filed an application to move from 1090 kHz to 1080 kHz and move the station from Milan, New Mexico to Moriarty, New Mexico. The FCC granted a construction permit on September 20, 2017. It was granted a license to cover the new location on June 15, 2021.

The station changed its call sign to KMYN on March 7, 2019, then again to KEMR on April 9, 2019.

On January 3, 2022, the station filed a silent notification stating that the station would be off the air while the FM translator K271DC would be moved from the AM broadcasting tower to a new site. Broadcasts for both signals would commence in mid-July 2022.

On June 3, 2022, it was announced that the station was sold to local broadcaster Don Davis for $10.

References

External links

FCC construction permit

EMR (AM)
Torrance County, New Mexico
Radio stations established in 1989
1989 establishments in New Mexico
EMR